Santissimo Sacramento a Tor de' Schiavi is a 20th-century parochial church and titular church in eastern Rome, dedicated to the Blessed Sacrament.

History 

The church was built in 1966–68. It has received three papal visits: Paul VI in 1972, John Paul II in 1993 and Francis in 2018.

On 28 June 2017, it was made a titular church to be held by a cardinal-priest.

Cardinal-protectors
 Gregorio Rosa Chávez (2017–present)

References

External links

Titular churches
Rome Q. VII Prenestino-Labicano
Roman Catholic churches completed in 1968
20th-century Roman Catholic church buildings in Italy